Moustafa Buihamghet (born 1 January 1964) is a Moroccan weightlifter. He competed in the men's bantamweight event at the 1996 Summer Olympics.

References

1964 births
Living people
Moroccan male weightlifters
Olympic weightlifters of Morocco
Weightlifters at the 1996 Summer Olympics
Place of birth missing (living people)